The Box-Lobby Challenge is a comedy play by the British writer Richard Cumberland. It was first staged at the Haymarket Theatre in February 1794. It is a farcical comedy of manners set amongst the working class.

References

Bibliography
 Mudford, William. The Life of Richard Cumberland. Sherwood, Neely & Jones, 1812.
 Nicoll, Allardyce. A History of English Drama 1660-1900. Volume III: Late Eighteenth Century Drama. Cambridge University Press, 1952.

Plays by Richard Cumberland
1794 plays
Comedy plays
West End plays